Haludkanali (also written as Halud Kanali) is a village and gram panchayat in the Ranibandh CD block in the Khatra subdivision of the Bankura district in the state of West Bengal, India.

Geography

Location

Area overview
The map alongside shows the Khatra subdivision of Bankura district. Physiographically, this area is having uneven lands with hard rocks. In the Khatra CD block area there are some low hills. The Kangsabati project reservoir is prominently visible in the map. The subdued patches of shaded area in the map show forested areas It is an almost fully rural area.

Note: The map alongside presents some of the notable locations in the subdivision. All places marked in the map are linked in the larger full screen map.

Demographics
According to the 2011 Census of India, Halud Kanali had a total population of 1,502, of which 745 (50%) were males and 757 (50%) were females. There were 158 persons in the age range of 0–6 years. The total number of literate persons in Halud Kanali was 0-3 (67.19% of the population over 6 years).

.*For language details see Ranibandh (community development block)#Language and religion

Education
Birsha Munda Memorial College was established at Pirrah, PO Haludkanali, in 2010. Affiliated with the Bankura University, it offers honours courses in Bengali, Santali, history and a general course in arts.

Haludkanali Primary School is a Bengali-medium coeducational institution established in 1980. It has facilities for teaching from class I to class IV.

Dhadkidighi Junior High School is a Bengali-medium coeducational institution established in 2011. It has facilities for teaching from class V to class VIII. The school has a playground.

Natundihi Rashidia Senior Madrasha is a Bengali-medium coeducational institution established in 2003. It has facilities for teaching from class I to class VIII. The madrasha has a library with 200 books and a playground.

There is a higher secondary school at Ranibandh.

Healthcare
There is a primary health centre at Haludkanali, with 6 beds.

References

Villages in Bankura district